Bembecia sanguinolenta is a moth of the family Sesiidae. It is found from Bulgaria and Greece to Asia Minor, Armenia, Syria and Turkmenistan.

The larvae feed on the roots of Astragalus species, including Astragalus dipsaceus and Astragalus pinetorum.

Subspecies
Bembecia sanguinolenta sanguinolenta
Bembecia sanguinolenta turcmena (Bartel, 1912)

Taxonomy
Populations in Turkey and Syria have long been treated as Bembecia pontica, which is now considered a synonym.

References

Moths described in 1853
Sesiidae
Moths of Europe
Moths of Asia